Mirror Mirror is an album by the American jazz saxophonist Joe Henderson, recorded in 1980 and released on the German MPS label. It features pianist Chick Corea, bassist Ron Carter and drummer Billy Higgins.

Reception 
The AllMusic review states: "This lesser-known album finds Henderson in typically fine form in an acoustic quartet".

Track listing
 "Mirror Mirror" (Chick Corea) - 5:53
 "Candlelight" (Ron Carter) - 6:13
 "Keystone" (Carter) - 9:40
 "Joe's Bolero" (Joe Henderson) - 9:43
 "What's New?" (Johnny Burke, Bob Haggart) - 3:58
 "Blues for Liebestraum" (Corea) - 7:56

Personnel
Joe Henderson - tenor saxophone
Chick Corea - piano
Ron Carter - bass
Billy Higgins - drums

References 

MPS Records albums
Pausa Records albums
Joe Henderson albums
1980 albums